The Farm at Les Collettes, Cagnes is an early 20th century oil on canvas painting by French artist Pierre-Auguste Renoir. The work is in the collection of the Metropolitan Museum of Art.

The painting depicts the farm in Cagnes-sur-Mer on the Mediterranean coast of Southern France to which Renoir was forced to relocate in 1908 to help alleviate the effects of his rheumatoid arthritis. Although the original farmhouse is depicted in the painting, Renoir actually lived in a newly built house elsewhere on the estate.

References 

Paintings by Pierre-Auguste Renoir
Paintings in the collection of the Metropolitan Museum of Art
1914 paintings